In Defense of the National Interest (full title In Defense of the National interest: A Critical Examination of American Foreign Policy) is a 1951 book by realist academic Hans Morgenthau. The book is a critique of what Morgenthau calls 'deeply ingrained habits of thought and preconceptions as to the nature of foreign policy in the United States'.

See also
 Politics Among Nations
 Scientific Man versus Power Politics

References

Books about international relations
1951 non-fiction books
Political realism
International relations theory
Alfred A. Knopf books